Events from the year 1995 in Scotland.

Incumbents 

 Secretary of State for Scotland and Keeper of the Great Seal – Ian Lang until 5 July; then Michael Forsyth

Law officers 
 Lord Advocate – Lord Rodger of Earlsferry; then Donald Mackay
 Solicitor General for Scotland – Thomas Dawson; then Donald Mackay; then Paul Cullen

Judiciary 
 Lord President of the Court of Session and Lord Justice General – Lord Hope
 Lord Justice Clerk – Lord Ross
 Chairman of the Scottish Land Court – Lord Philip

Events 
 Early – The Deep-fried Mars bar originates at Haven Chip Bar in Stonehaven.
 6 April – 1995 Scottish local elections are held for the 29 new mainland unitary authorities that will replace the Regional and District Councils next year.
 7 April – Rob Roy, starring Liam Neeson as Robert Roy MacGregor, is released.
 18 April – Caledonian MacBrayne Ullapool-Stornoway ferry  is launched at Ferguson Shipbuilders' Port Glasgow yard.
 24 May – Braveheart, directed by and starring Mel Gibson as William Wallace, is released; it goes on to win five Academy Awards at the 68th Academy Awards.
 25 May – Perth and Kinross by-election: Roseanna Cunningham wins for the Scottish National Party with a swing of 11.6%.
 16 June – FirstBus is formed by merger of Badgerline with GRT Group of Aberdeen.
 17 June - Pride March The first Pride march in Scotland gathers on Barony Street in Edinburgh on 17 June. 
 19 July – The Children (Scotland) Act, which seeks to put into legislation the provisions of the United Nations Convention on the Rights of the Child, receives the Royal Assent.
 17 August – Arran distillery opens.
 11 October – Duncan Ferguson, the 23-year-old Everton F.C. striker, receives a three-month prison sentence for assaulting an opponent while playing for Rangers F.C eighteen months earlier. Ferguson is the first British footballer to be jailed for an on-field offence.
 12 October – Boxer James Murray suffers serious head injuries in a fight at a Glasgow hotel, leading to a declaration of brain death on 15 October, sparking calls for boxing to be banned.
 16 October – Skye bridge opened.
 November – The first onshore wind farm in Scotland, Hagshaw Hill in South Lanarkshire, is commissioned.
 8 November – Criminal Procedure (Scotland) Act 1995 passed.
 22 November – Duncan Ferguson is released from prison after serving 42 days of his three-month sentence.
 30 November – Scottish Constitutional Convention publishes its blueprint for devolution, Scotland's Parliament, Scotland's Right.
 30 December – Altnaharra matches the lowest temperature UK Weather Record at -27.2 °C.

The arts 
 Dunedin Consort formed.
 Andrew O'Hagan's first novel, The Missing, is published.
 Alan Warner's first novel, Morvern Callar is published; it is a winner of the Somerset Maugham Award in 1996.

Births 
 21 January
Chloe Arthur, footballer
David McNeil, footballer
 31 March – Fiona Brown, footballer
 11 April – Thomas Muirhead, curler
 21 April – Thomas Doherty, actor and singer
 20 June – Caroline Weir, footballer
 14 July – Megan Cunningham, footballer
 6 October – Ross Muir, snooker player
 1 December – Jenna Fife, footballer
 11 December – Abbi Grant, footballer
 19 December – Lewis Vaughan, footballer

Deaths 
 14 January – Alexander Gibson, conductor and opera intendant (born 1926)
 February – Robert Stewart, textile designer (born 1924)
 19 February – Nicholas Fairbairn, lawyer and Conservative politician (born 1933)
 19 April – Neil Paterson, writer and footballer (born 1915)
 9 October – Alec Douglas-Home, Lord Home of the Hirsel, Conservative Prime Minister of the United Kingdom (born 1903)
 15 October – James Murray, boxer (born 1969)
 24 October – Ronnie Selby Wright, Church of Scotland minister (born 1908)

See also 
 1995 in Northern Ireland

References 

 
Scotland
Years of the 20th century in Scotland
1990s in Scotland